News Star or News-Star is the name of several newspapers:

The News-Star, in Monroe, Louisiana
News-Star (Chicago), in Chicago, Illinois
The Shawnee News-Star, in Shawnee, Oklahoma

See also
News and Star, a local tabloid newspaper in Cumbria, UK
Waterford News & Star, a local newspaper in Waterford, Ireland
Star News (disambiguation)